Herbert Meinhard Mühlpfordt (31 March 1893 – 9 October 1982) was a German internist, art historian, and cultural historian.

Life

Mühlpfordt was born in Königsberg, East Prussia, to dentist Meinhard Mühlpfordt and Clara Mühlpfordt (née Adloff). He attended the Collegium Fridericianum where he completed his Abitur. Mühlpfordt studied medicine, literature, and art history at Freiburg (1912), Munich (1912–13), and the Albertina (1913–14). After serving in World War I from 1914 to 1918, he completed his Staatsexamen in 1920 and received his doctorate in medicine in 1921. Mühlpfordt worked at the Charité in Berlin, in Allenstein (Olsztyn) (1922), and as chief of dermatology at St. Marien-Hospital in Allenstein (1929–37). In 1937 he opened his own practice in Königsberg.

During World War II Mühlpfordt served as a physician (Stabsarzt and Oberstabsarzt) in the Wehrmacht from 1939 until his discharge for health reasons in 1944. From January 1945 until April he tended to refugees in Pillau (Baltiysk) and the Vistula Spit during the evacuation of East Prussia. On 16 April he took a refugee transport to Wismar. He settled in Lübeck, where he maintained his practice until 1959.

Aside from his medical practice, Mühlpfordt also wrote about the local history of East and West Prussia, especially his hometown Königsberg, contributing to newspapers, journals, and his own reference works. He also wrote a novel about Wilhelmine Königsberg, Der Goldene Ball, Ein Familienroman unserer Zeit.  Mühlpfordt was recognized by the Historische Kommission für ost- und westpreußische Landesforschung in 1969, received the Goldene Ehrennadel of the Landsmannschaft Ostpreußen in 1970, and received the Bürgermedaille of the Stadtgemeinschaft Königsberg in 1977. He died in Lübeck.

Selected works
Welche Mitbürger hat Königsberg öffentlich geehrt? (1963)
Königsberger Leben in Bräuchen und Volkstum (1968)
Königsberger Skulpturen  und ihre Meister 1255–1945 (1970)
Königsberg von A-Z. Ein Stadtlexikon (1972)
Königsberger Leben im Rokoko. Bedeutende Zeitgenossen Kants (1981)

References

External links
Kulturportal West-Ost

1893 births
1982 deaths
20th-century German historians
Cultural historians
German art historians
German dermatologists
German medical writers
German military personnel of World War I
German Army officers of World War II
Historians of Germany
German military doctors
Physicians from Königsberg
People from East Prussia
Physicians from Lübeck
University of Freiburg alumni
University of Königsberg alumni
Ludwig Maximilian University of Munich alumni
German male non-fiction writers
Writers from Königsberg